Korzybie may refer to:

Korzybie, Mława County, in Masovian Voivodeship (east-central Poland)
Korzybie, Płońsk County, in Masovian Voivodeship (east-central Poland)
Korzybie, Pomeranian Voivodeship (north Poland)

See also
 Korzybski